Statistics of Danish National Football Tournament in the 1920/1921 season.

Province tournament

First round
Helsingør IF 3-2 IK Viking Rønne

Second round
Aarhus Gymnastikforening 2-1 Boldklubben 1909
Boldklubben 1901 2-1 Helsingør IF

Third round
Aarhus Gymnastikforening 3-1 Boldklubben 1901

Copenhagen Championship

Final
Akademisk Boldklub 3-0 Aarhus Gymnastikforening

References
Denmark - List of final tables (RSSSF)

Top level Danish football league seasons
1920–21 in Danish football
Denmark